Gréta Kerekes (born 9 October 1992 in Debrecen) is a Hungarian athlete specialising in the sprint hurdles. She represented her country at the 2016 World Indoor Championships without qualifying for the final.

Her personal bests are 12.95 seconds in the 100 metres hurdles (+1.9 m/s, Székesfehérvár 2018) and 8.00 seconds in the 60 metres hurdles (Istanbul 2023, Semifinal).

Personal best

Competition record

References 

1992 births
Living people
Sportspeople from Debrecen
Hungarian female hurdlers
UTEP Miners women's track and field athletes
Athletes (track and field) at the 2019 European Games
European Games medalists in athletics
European Games bronze medalists for Hungary
Competitors at the 2015 Summer Universiade
Competitors at the 2017 Summer Universiade
21st-century Hungarian women
20th-century Hungarian women